Luke James (born 18 March 1999) is an English rugby union player, currently playing with the Sale Sharks. He usually plays as an inside centre but has also played numerous times as a full-back and occasionally as an outside centre. He made his professional debut against Saracens 23 September 2017. Luke James gained his first cap on 11 May 2018 against the Junior Springboks at Sixways Stadium. A year later, James was called up to the U20's World Championship 2019 in which he gained a further 4 caps for England U20's.

References 

1999 births
Living people
English rugby union players
Rugby union centres
Rugby union players from Manchester
Sale Sharks players